Gauchos of Eldorado is a 1941 American Western "Three Mesquiteers" B-movie directed by Lester Orlebeck.

Cast
 Bob Steele as Tucson Smith
 Tom Tyler as Stony Brooke
 Rufe Davis as Lullaby Joslin
 Lois Collier as Ellen
 Duncan Renaldo as Gaucho / José Ojara
 Rosina Galli as Isabel Ojara
 Norman Willis as Bart Braden
 William Ruhl as Sam Tyndal
 Tony Roux as Miguel
 Ray Bennett as Monk Stevens (as Raphael Bennett)
 Yakima Canutt as Henchman Snakes

References

External links

1941 films
1941 Western (genre) films
American Western (genre) films
American black-and-white films
Republic Pictures films
Three Mesquiteers films
Fictional gauchos
Films about gauchos
Films directed by Lester Orlebeck
1940s English-language films
1940s American films